Tiliacora lehmbachii is a species of plant in the family Menispermaceae. It is found in Cameroon and the Democratic Republic of the Congo. Its natural habitat is subtropical or tropical moist lowland forest. It is threatened by habitat loss.

References

Menispermaceae
Endangered plants
Taxonomy articles created by Polbot